Abdur Rashid Sarkar is a Jatiya Party (Ershad) politician and the former Member of Parliament of Gaibandha-2.

Career
Sarkar was elected to parliament from Gaibandha-2 as a Jatiya Party candidate in 1991 and June 1996. He contested the 2018 election from Gaibandha-2 as a Bangladesh Nationalist Party candidate after failing to get the Jatiya Party nomination.

References

Jatiya Party politicians
Living people
5th Jatiya Sangsad members
7th Jatiya Sangsad members
Year of birth missing (living people)